Chad Hartman is an American radio talk show host on WCCO-AM.

Personal

Hartman is the son of longtime Minnesota sportswriter Sid Hartman.

Hartman graduated from Robbinsdale Armstrong High School. In 1988 he graduated from  Arizona State University.

History as KFAN radio host

Hartman's previous job was at KFAN, headquartered in St. Louis Park, Minnesota.  His show aired every weekday from 2 to 4 pm. Hartman interviewed so many guests on his show, he earned the nickname "The Barbara Walters of the Fan".

Hartman was terminated by KFAN management, Clear Channel Communications, in January 2009. He was the longest-tenured remaining member of KFAN's predecessor – WDGY.

Hartman was the primary radio voice for the Minnesota Timberwolves from 1997 to 2006.

References

American talk radio hosts
Arizona State University alumni
Radio personalities from Minneapolis
Minnesota Timberwolves announcers
Minnesota Twins announcers
Minnesota Vikings announcers
Year of birth missing (living people)
Living people
Major League Baseball broadcasters
National Basketball Association broadcasters
National Football League announcers